Quirindi Airport  is a small airport located  west of Quirindi, New South Wales, Australia. The airport is sometimes used by trainee military pilots from BAe Systems College for circuits as an alternative to Tamworth Airport.

See also
List of airports in New South Wales

References

Airports in New South Wales
Liverpool Plains Shire